Mark Viska (born 29 April 1971) is a former Australian rules footballer who played with Adelaide in the Australian Football League (AFL) during the 1990s.

Viska, who was a member of Glenelg's losing 1992 SANFL Grand Final team, joined Adelaide in 1993. He played mostly as a half back and played finals football in his debut season after making his first game mid year. Viska however could only put together 23 more appearances for Adelaide in the following four seasons, two of them in their 1997 premiership winning year. He retired from football after the 2001 SANFL season, having played 143 games for Glenelg.

References

1971 births
Adelaide Football Club players
Glenelg Football Club players
Australian rules footballers from South Australia
Living people